This is a discography of E.S.G., an American hip hop recording artist from Houston, Texas.

As of 2018, for his career, Screwed Up Click descendant Cedric Hill has released 12 studio albums, of which eleven are his solo projects and one album he released in collaboration with Slim Thug. His recent studio album, Kingish, was dropped on June 27, 2015.

Albums

Studio albums

Compilations

Mixtapes

Singles

As lead artist

Guest appearances

References

External links 

Hip hop discographies
Discographies of American artists